Dan Rodricks is a longtime columnist for The Baltimore Sun newspapers, and former host of the Roughly Speaking podcast for baltimoresun.com. He was previously the host of Midday, a two-hour, daily talk show on WYPR FM 88.1, the NPR station in Baltimore, and the host of "Rodricks For Breakfast" on WMAR-TV, (Channel 2.1).

After arriving in Baltimore from New England, Rodricks started writing a column for the former afternoon paper, The Evening Sun in 1979. The column has appeared at least twice per week, but most often three times per week, ever since. The column moved to the newly consolidated morning and evening editions of The Sun in 1990. It is one of the longest-running newspaper columns in the U.S.

Rodricks' "Dear Drug Dealers" series in The Sun, a public call for an end to criminal violence in Baltimore, won the 2006 "Excellence in Urban Journalism Award" from the Freedom Forum and the Enterprise Foundation (established by Gannett Newspapers) and the 2005 "Public Service Award" from the Chesapeake Associated Press. Thousands of ex-felons and current incarcerated prisoners over the years contacted Rodricks seeking help in post-prison employment.  Rodricks has won national awards, including the "National Headliners Award" for commentary and the "Heywood Broun Award" from the Newspaper Guild for columns that championed the underdog. His columns have won numerous awards from the Maryland-Delaware-D.C. Press Association. Rodricks has frequently been cited as best columnist by readers of the longtime metro monthly periodical, Baltimore magazine and the weekly alternative newspaper, the Baltimore City Paper.

From 1980 to 1993, Rodricks produced a weekly commentary or feature for WBAL-TV's 5 pm newscast. From 1989 until 1993, Rodricks hosted a nightly talk show on WBAL-AM (1090), as well as a five-hour Saturday morning radio show that ran until 1995. His radio documentaries won the "Silver Medal" in an international broadcast competition in 1993.  Rodricks weekly hosted a live, local-interest Saturday morning television show, "Rodricks For Breakfast" on WMAR-TV from January 1995 until October 1999. His Midday show ran on WYPR-FM from 2008 until 2015, when Rodricks created the Roughly Speaking podcast for the Baltimore Sun. The podcast was retired after 450 episodes in 2019. A collection of Rodricks' columns, "Mencken Doesn't Live Here Anymore," was published in 1989. His second book, "Father's Day Creek: Fly Fishing, Fatherhood and The Last Best Place on Earth," was published by Apprentice House in 2019. It was selected as one of the top five books of the year by Trout, the national magazine of Trout Unlimited.

References

External links
 link to columns

American columnists
American newspaper editors
American radio personalities
Writers from Baltimore
People from East Bridgewater, Massachusetts
Place of birth missing (living people)
The Baltimore Sun people
University of Bridgeport alumni
Living people
Year of birth missing (living people)